Camars was an ancient Etruscan city, situated in the village of Gonfienti in the Prato municipality, Tuscany, Italy. The city was discovered during the course of modern excavation for the creation of the Prato Interport. The ancient site is also spread across  the modern municipalities of Campi Bisenzio and Calenzano; the Poggio Castiglioni hill is the site of the upper citadel of the ancient city.

Overview
Excavation revealed substantial evidence for daily life. The site is connected to the Adriatic Sea by means of the Via Salaria which leaves the site en route to Adria.

A substantial courtyard house has been compared to other examples of Etruscan house plans, for instance those of Marzabotto.

References
 Cifani, G. 2008. Architettura romana arcaica : edilizia e società tra monarchia e repubblica. Rome. "L'Erma" di Bretschneider.
 Martini, I. P. 2010. Landscapes and Societies: Selected Cases. Springer.

External links

 Città etrusca di Prato
 

Prato
Etruscan cities